Non serviam is a Latin phrase which means "I will not serve".

Non Serviam may also refer to:

 Non Serviam (book), a poetry collection by Gunnar Ekelöf
 Non Serviam (album), a music album by Rotting Christ
 Non Serviam (Lem), a fictional book, a subject of a fictional review by Stanisław Lem
 Non Serviam (band), an extreme metal collective from France